The Northern franchise has been operated by the following train operating companies in England:

Northern Rail 20042016
Arriva Rail North 20162020
Northern Trains 2020present